Thomas Biggin Broadbent (1793–1817), was an English preacher.

Life
Broadbent was the only child of William Broadbent and was born at Warrington on 17 March 1793. He entered Glasgow College in November 1809. After graduating in April 1813, he became classical tutor in the Unitarian academy at Hackney, an office he filled till 1816, preaching latterly at Prince's Street Chapel, Westminster, during a vacancy. His pulpit powers were remarkable. Resigning his London work, he returned to Warrington to pursue his ministerial training as his father's assistant. He died of apoplexy on 9 November 1817.

Writings
He prepared for the press, in 1816, portions (1 and 2 Cor., 1 Tim., and Titus) of Thomas Belsham's Epistles of Paul the Apostle, published in four volumes in 1822. He also edited the fourth edition (1817) of the "Improved Version" of the New Testament, originally published in 1808 under Belsham's superintendence. Two of his sermons, published posthumously in 1817, reached a second edition.

References

 

1793 births
1817 deaths
People from Warrington
19th-century English non-fiction writers
English religious writers